A Live Record is the first live album by the progressive rock band Camel, released in 1978. It is a double LP, composed of recordings from three different tours.

LP one features recordings from the Mirage tour in 1974, and the Rain Dances tour, in 1977. Tracks 1–4 on the LP are from the Rain Dances tour and 5–6 are from the Mirage tour.

LP 2 features the original line-up all the way, and is devoted to a complete performance of the band's instrumental concept album, The Snow Goose, during the tour for the album in 1975, performed with the London Symphony Orchestra at the Royal Albert Hall, London, October 1975. The remastered edition released in 2002 contains seven additional tracks not released originally and the tracks in a different order.

Track listing of the 1978 release

LP One:Side A
"Never Let Go"  – 7:29
Recorded at the Hammersmith Odeon, London, October 1977.
"Song Within a Song"  – 7:09
Recorded at the Hammersmith Odeon, London, September 1977.
"Lunar Sea"  – 9:01
Recorded at the Colston Hall, Bristol, October 1977.

LP One:Side B
"Skylines"  – 5:43
Recorded at Leeds University, October 1977.
"Ligging at Louis' "  – 6:39
"Lady Fantasy: Encounter/Smiles for You/Lady Fantasy"  – 14:27
The above two tracks were recorded at the Marquee, London, October 1974.

LP Two:Side C
"The Great Marsh"  – 1:45
"Rhayader"  – 3:08
"Rhayader Goes to Town"  – 5:12
"Sanctuary"  – 1:10
"Fritha"  – 1:22
"The Snow Goose"  – 3:03
"Friendship"  – 1:39
"Migration"  – 3:52
"Rhayader Alone"  – 1:48All songs recorded at the Royal Albert Hall, London, October 1975.LP Two:Side D
"Flight of the Snow Goose"  – 2:59
"Preparation"  – 4:11
"Dunkirk"  – 5:28
"Epitaph"  – 2:34
"Fritha Alone"  – 1:24
"La Princesse Perdue"  – 4:44
"The Great Marsh (Reprise)"  – 2:27All songs recorded at the Royal Albert Hall, London, October 1975.''

Personnel
 Andrew Latimer – guitar, flute, vocals
 Peter Bardens – keyboards
 Doug Ferguson – bass (LP one: 5, 6 / LP two)
 Richard Sinclair – bass, vocals (LP one: 1, 2, 3, 4)
 Andy Ward – drums, percussion
 Mel Collins – saxophones, flute (LP one: 1, 2, 3, 4)

Track listing of the 2002 CD reissue by Universal Music / Decca Record Company

Disc One

"First Light" – 5:27 (previously unreleased)
"Metrognome" – 4:23 (previously unreleased)
"Unevensong" – 5:36 (previously unreleased)
"Skylines" – 5:43
"A Song Within a Song" – 7:09
"Lunar Sea" – 9:01
"Rain Dances" – 2:33 (previously unreleased)
"Never Let Go" – 7:29
"Chord Change" – 6:52 (previously unreleased)
"Ligging at Louis' " – 6:39
"Lady Fantasy: Encounter/Smiles for You/Lady Fantasy" – 14:27
1–3 & 6–7 recorded at the Colston Hall, Bristol, October 1977.
4 recorded at Leeds University, October 1977.
5 & 8 recorded at the Hammersmith Odeon, London, October 1977.
9 recorded at the Hammersmith Odeon, London, April 1976.
10 & 11 recorded at the Marquee, London, October 1974.

Disc Two

All songs by Peter Bardens and Andrew Latimer.

"Spoken Introduction by Peter Bardens" – 1:10
"The Great Marsh" – 1:45
"Rhayader" – 3:08
"Rhayader Goes to Town" – 5:12
"Sanctuary" – 1:10
"Fritha" – 1:22
"The Snow Goose" – 3:03
"Friendship" – 1:39
"Migration" – 3:52
"Rhayader Alone" – 1:48
"Flight of the Snow Goose" – 2:59
"Preparation" – 4:11
"Dunkirk" – 5:28
"Epitaph" – 2:34
"Fritha Alone" – 1:24
"La Princesse Perdue" – 4:44
"The Great Marsh (Reprise)" – 2:27
"The White Rider" – 8:48 (previously unreleased)
"Another Night" – 6:35 (previously unreleased)
1–17 recorded at the Royal Albert Hall, London, October 1975.
18 & 19 recorded at the Hammersmith Odeon, London, April 1976.

Charts

References

External links
 Camel - A Live Record (1978) album review, credits & releases at AllMusic.com
 
 Camel - A Live Record (1978) album review by menawati, credits & user reviews at SputnikMusic.com
 Camel - A Live Record (1978) album to be listened as stream at Play.Spotify.com

Albums produced by Rhett Davies
Camel (band) live albums
1978 live albums
Decca Records live albums
Deram Records live albums
Live albums recorded at the Royal Albert Hall